Julià Fernàndez Ariza (born 19 November 1974) is an Andorran footballer. He currently plays for Santa Coloma and the Andorra national team. He has won both the Andorran First Division and the Andorran Cup several times.

Club career
Fernàndez scored the only goal in the UEFA Cup 2007–08 first qualifying round against Maccabi Tel Aviv, the first goal ever in a win for a team from Andorra in a European Cup. However, Maccabi Tel Aviv went on to win 4–0.

International career
He also scored a consolation goal for Andorra in the squad's 2008 UEFA European Football Championship qualifying match against Israel.

International goal
Scores and results list Andorra's goal tally first.

National team statistics

References

1974 births
Living people
Andorran footballers
Association football defenders
Andorra international footballers
FC Santa Coloma players